"Burn" is a song by British rock band Deep Purple. It was released on the album of the same name in 1974, and was the first single by the Mark III lineup.

History
"Burn" served as the band's concert opener for the next two years, taking over from "Highway Star". It opened Deep Purple's televised set at the California Jam festival two months after its release, on 6 April 1974.

After Deep Purple's 1976 split-up, Coverdale formed his own band, Whitesnake which over the years has featured Deep Purple members such as Jon Lord and Ian Paice, and has performed Deep Purple songs from the lineups he was part of, Mark III and IV, such as "Burn", "Mistreated", "Might Just Take Your Life" and "Stormbringer".

After the Deep Purple 1984 reunion, the song was no longer played, as Mark II vocalist Ian Gillan rejoined the band, and would not sing songs from the Mark III and IV eras. The band did perform "Burn" live in 1991, during the time in which Gillan was briefly replaced by Joe Lynn Turner. Deep Purple also played the "Burn" riff during "Speed King" medley in live performances in 1993.

Glenn Hughes also features the song regularly in his live solo performances, as well as with his project, the supergroup Black Country Communion. In a Billboard magazine interview Eddie Van Halen named "Burn" one of his all-time favourite guitar riffs.

Song structure
Both David Coverdale (all verses) and Glenn Hughes (bridge) sing lead vocals on "Burn". Ritchie Blackmore (guitar) and Jon Lord (organ, synthesizer) both have solos in the full-length version of the song.

Personnel
David Coverdale – vocals, composer
Glenn Hughes – bass, vocals
Jon Lord – Hammond organ, ARP Odyssey, composer
Ritchie Blackmore – guitar, composer
Ian Paice – drums, composer

References

1974 songs
Deep Purple songs
EMI Records singles
Songs written by David Coverdale
Songs written by Ritchie Blackmore
Songs written by Jon Lord
Songs written by Ian Paice
Warner Records singles